Chlamydastis synedra is a moth of the family Depressariidae. It is found in Paraguay.

The wingspan is about 18 mm. The forewings are very pale brownish-ochreous with a small brown spot on the costa at one-fourth, a small faint brownish spot towards the dorsum in the middle, and three minute groups of raised black and brownish scales forming a nearly straight line with these, two representing the first discal and plical stigmata. There is a brown spot on the middle of the costa, where a faintly sinuate row of dark fuscous marks suffused with brownish runs to the dorsum before the tornus. There is also a median blackish dot representing the second discal stigma and a strongly curved brownish line, suffusedly dotted with dark fuscous, from a suffused spot on the costa at three-fourths to the tornus. A thick brown streak, marked with blackish, runs from the middle of the postmedian line to below the middle of the termen, indistinctly interrupted before the subterminal line. The hindwings are light grey, suffused with whitish anteriorly.

References

Moths described in 1916
Chlamydastis